Blairstown Airport  is a public-use airport located two nautical miles (3.7 km) southwest of the central business district of Blairstown, Warren County, New Jersey, United States. The southeastern edge of the airport property sits upon the path of the former Lackawanna Cut-Off railway line.

Facilities and aircraft 

For the 12-month period ending January 1, 2014, the airport had 19,790 general aviation aircraft operations, an average of 54 per day. At that time there were 143 aircraft based at this airport: 56% single-engine, 5% multi-engine, 3% helicopter and 36% glider.

Services available on field include 100LL fuel, major airframe service, major powerplant service, tie-downs, hangars, parking, flight school and glider operation. There is a restaurant located on the field called Donna's Runway Cafe.

References

External links
Blairstown Airport (official site)
Jersey Ridge Soaring (glider operation)
Jersey Ridge Soaring – Flight School (glider flight training)
Aero Club Albatross (glider club)
Freedoms Wings International (soaring for people with disabilities)
Orlandi Flight Center (official site)
North East Wings Aviation Maintenance

Airports in New Jersey
Blairstown, New Jersey
Transportation buildings and structures in Warren County, New Jersey